Josef Helbling (born 15 July 1935) is a Swiss former cyclist. He competed in the 1000m time trial at the 1960 Summer Olympics.

References

External links
 

1935 births
Living people
Swiss male cyclists
Olympic cyclists of Switzerland
Cyclists at the 1960 Summer Olympics
People from Rapperswil-Jona
Sportspeople from the canton of St. Gallen